Tomoxia exoleta is a species of beetle in the genus Tomoxia of the family Mordellidae. It was described by Lea in 1917.

References

Beetles described in 1917
Tomoxia